A train simulator (also railroad simulator or railway simulator) is a computer based simulation of rail transport operations. They are generally large complicated software packages modeling a 3D virtual reality world implemented both as commercial trainers, and consumer computer game software with 'play modes' which lets the user interact by stepping inside the virtual world. Because of the near view modeling, often at speed, train simulator software is generally far more complicated and difficult software to write and implement than flight simulator programs.

Industrial train simulations

Like flight simulators, train simulators have been produced for railway training purposes. Driver simulators include those produced by:
 Transurb Simulation, a Belgian-based company
 FAAC (the training division of Arotech Corporation) in the United States 
 Ongakukan in Japan
 EADS in Germany
 Bentley Systems in the UK
 Lander Simulation & Training Solutions, Spain
 CORYS, a French company with offices in Grenoble, France and Jacksonville, FL, USA
 Krauss-Maffei Wegmann GmbH & Co KG (KMW), a German company based in Munich
 Oktal Sydac in Australia, France, India and the UK
 SMART Simulatation - part of the Neokon Baltija group from Lithuania with offices in the UK and Russia.
 New York Air Brake, an American company based in Watertown, NY.
 PS Technology, an American company based in Boulder, CO.

Signaller training simulators have been developed by Funkwerk in Germany, The Railway Engineering Company (TRE) in the UK, OpenTrack Railway Technology in Switzerland, and PS Technology in the US.

Types of train simulators 
There are various types of train driving simulators that are adapted to varying training needs and can be combined to meet operators' training needs in the most efficient way.

Full-cabin simulators 
Similarly to flight simulators, train simulators can be a replica of a full driving cabin, on a one-to-one scale. This type of simulator is opted for when a train operator needs an immersive training tool for particularly effective training sessions.

Intermediate, more compact simulators 
Certain simulators can uphold a certain level of immersion while optimising the space of a training room. When a certain balance between immersion and scalability is needed, this type of simulator is chosen by instructors.

Portable simulators 
When a train operator has various training centres, it is sometimes easier and more logical to invest in smaller simulators that can be transported from one centre to another. The company Transurb Simulation was the first to propose such a tool, which has now been adopted by many operators around the world and is becoming of a growing interest for smaller operators.

Consumer train simulation 
Many consumer train simulations have been produced, often focusing on different aspects of real-life railways.

Driving simulation
Train driving simulation games usually allow a user to have a "driver's view" from the locomotive's cab and operate realistic cab controls such as throttle, brake valve, sand, horn and whistle, lights etc.

Train driving simulation software includes:
 BVE Trainsim (originally Boso View Express) is a Japanese three-dimensional computer-based train simulator. It is notable for focusing on providing an accurate driving experience as viewed from inside the cab, rather than creating a network of other trains—There are no outside views, drivers can only look directly ahead, and other trains passed along the route are only displayed as stationary objects.<ref
 name="hanstater"></ref>
 Densha de Go!, a Japanese train simulation game series focused on driving, developed by Taito.
 Diesel Railcar Simulator, a train simulator focusing on British diesel-mechanical railcars.
 Microsoft Train Simulator (MSTS), developed by Kuju Entertainment.
 Open Rails, an open source, freeware simulator that is backwards compatible with Microsoft Train Simulator content.
 Rail Simulator, a spiritual successor to MSTS also developed by Kuju Entertainment.
 Train Simulator (originally RailWorks), a successor to Rail Simulator created when a new company, Rail Simulator Developments Ltd, purchased the rights. In 2013 RSDL rebranded themselves as Dovetail Games, and renamed Railworks to simply Train Simulator.
 Train Sim World, a successor to the above developed by Dovetail Games using the Unreal Engine.
 Run8, a primarily multiplayer train simulator focused on realistic North American freight operations.
 Train Simulator series (a.k.a. Railfan)
 Trainz
 MaSzyna, a freeware train simulator mainly focusing on Polish mainline rolling stock.

The PC game 3D Ultra Lionel Traintown, amongst some others, give a different experience to driving, by being in a 3rd person omniscient perspective, controlling the trains from a bird's eye view.

Peripherals specifically designed for use with driving simulations include RailDriver by US manufacturer P.I. Engineering. RailDriver is a programmable desktop cab controller with throttle, brake lever and switches designed to work with Trainz, TrainMaster, Microsoft Train Simulator and Rail Simulator.

Strategy simulation
Railroad-themed strategy simulation video games are focused mostly on the economic part of the railroad industry rather than on technical detail. The A-Train series (1985 to present) is an early example. Chris Sawyer's Transport Tycoon (1994) was an influential game in this genre, spawning remakes such as Simutrans (1999 to present), OpenTTD (2004 to present) and Sawyer's own Locomotion (2004). Sid Meier designed two railroad simulations: Railroad Tycoon (1990) and Railroads! (2006). The Railroad Tycoon series itself inspired other rail games such as Rails Across America (2001).

Other genres
Some rail simulation games focus on railway signalling rather than driving or economics. Examples include The Train Game (1983),  SimSig, JBSS BAHN, Train Dispatcher, and the series of signalling simulations produced by PC-Rail Software.

History
Train simulators are particularly popular in Japan, where rail transport is the primary form of travel for most citizens. Train video games have been developed in Japan since the early 1980s, with Sega's arcade action game Super Locomotive (1982) being an early example, before more realistic train simulators emerged, such as Ongakukan's Train Simulator series (1995 debut) and Taito's Densha de Go series (1996 debut), as well as train business simulations such as the A-Train series (1985 debut). Non-commercial Japanese sims include the freeware BVE, first released in 1996, which was later remade as the free and open-source OpenBVE.

One of the first commercially available train simulators in the West was Southern Belle, released in 1985. The game simulated a journey of the Southern Belle steam passenger train from London Victoria to Brighton, while at the same time the player must comply with speed limits, not to go too fast on curves and keep to the schedule. It was followed with Evening Star in 1987. The first two train simulators to achieve large sales in the West, Microsoft Train Simulator and Trainz, arrived within a few months of one another in 2001. These featured differing design philosophies - Microsoft Train Simulator focused on providing a realistic driving experience, whereas Trainz focused more on the ability of the user to create their own content such as trains and routes.

The developers behind Microsoft Train Simulator, Kuju Entertainment, later released a spiritual successor called Rail Simulator, which was later purchased by a separate company and rereleased as Railworks.

See also 
 Flight simulator – contains reference to flight simulators
 Strategy computer game

References

External links 
 2TRAIN Benchmarking Report on computer-based Railway Training in Europe
 RailServe.com (Directory of train simulator sites)
 
 Railpage Train Simulator Support Forums(Online Support Forum and Add-on downloads)
 VR Reading Room: Hundreds of articles covering all train simulators
 Metro Simulation
 pagina Viajeros al Tren Add-on Soporte y foro en Español

 
Virtual reality
Video game terminology
Railroad games
1980s video games